This is a list of lighthouses in Chile from Arica to Easter Island.

Arica

Iquique

Mejillones

Antofagasta

Chañaral

Caldera

Isla Salas y Gómez

(Salas y Gómez lighthouse isn't listed by NGA)

Easter Island

See also
Lighthouses in Chile
List of fjords, channels, sounds and straits of Chile
List of islands of Chile

References

  List of Lights, Radio Aids and Fog Signals: The West Coast of North and South America... National Geospatial-Intelligence Agency. 2013. pp. 20–60.

NGA1080-NGA1155.5
NGA1080-NGA1155.5
Lighthouses NGA1080-NGA1155.5